The SS Bessemer (also called the Bessemer Saloon) was an experimental Victorian cross-channel passenger paddle steamer with a swinging cabin, a concept devised by the engineer and inventor Sir Henry Bessemer, intended to combat seasickness.

Background
Bessemer, a severe seasickness sufferer, devised in 1868 the idea of a ship whose passenger cabin - the Saloon - would be suspended on gimbals and kept horizontal mechanically to isolate the occupants from the ship's motion: an idea he patented in December 1869. After successful trials with a model, the levelling achieved by hydraulics controlled by a steersman watching a spirit level, Bessemer set up a limited joint stock company, the Saloon Ship Company, to run steamships between England and France. This gained £250,000 capital, financing the construction of a ship, the SS Bessemer, with the naval constructor Edward James Reed as chief designer.

Construction
Bessemer was a 4-paddle steamer (2 paddles each on port and starboard, one fore, one aft), length , breadth at deck beam , outside breadth across paddle-boxes, draught , gross register tonnage 1974 tons. Bessemer was built  by Earle's Shipbuilding of Hull. She was yard number 197 and was launched on 24 September 1874.

Career
On 21 October 1874, she was driven ashore at Hull in a gale. She was refloated and found to be undamaged. The ship sailed from Dover to Calais on a private trial in April 1875. On arrival, it sustained damage to a paddle-wheel when it hit the pier at Calais, due to its failure to answer to the helm at slow speed. The first and only public voyage took place on 8 May 1875, the ship sailing with the swinging cabin locked (some observers suggested due to its serious instability, although Bessemer ascribed it to insufficient time to fix the previous damage). The ship was operated by the London, Chatham and Dover Railway. After two attempts to enter the harbour, she crashed into the Calais pier again, this time demolishing part of it.

The poor performance lost the confidence of investors, leading to the winding-up of the Saloon Ship Company in 1876. On 29 December 1876, following the removal of the swinging saloon and other extensive alterations, Bessemer ran aground on the Burcom Sand, in the Humber upstream of Grimsby, Lincolnshire. She was refloated and taken in to Hull. The Board of Trade enquiry into the grounding found her captain at fault. His certificate was suspended for three months. Following its removal, designer Reed had the Saloon cabin moved to his home, Hextable House, Swanley, where it was used as a billiard room. When the house later became a women's college, Swanley Horticultural College, the Saloon was used as a lecture hall, but was destroyed by a direct hit when the college was bombed in World War II. The ship was subsequently docked at Dover until being sold for scrap in 1879.

The sole remaining parts of the ship are three carved wooden decorative panels from the saloon that were rescued from the wreckage after the bombing. One panel was valued on the Antiques Roadshow at between £300 - 400 in 2012.

References
Primary reference: The Bessemer Saloon Steam-Ship, Chapter XX, Sir Henry Bessemer, F.R.S. An Autobiography, online at University of Rochester.

1874 ships
Victorian-era passenger ships of the United Kingdom
Steamships of the United Kingdom
Paddle steamers
Ferries of England
Experimental ships
Maritime incidents in October 1874
Maritime incidents in December 1876